Atanasio de Urioste Velasco (1 January 1861 - 7 June 1929) was a Bolivian diplomat, politician, and socialite who served in Bolivian delegations to France and Russia. He belonged to the prominent Urioste family, a grandson of the magnate Atanasio de Urioste, was the brother of the Princess of La Glorieta, Clotilde de Urioste, and father to the industrialist and business magnate Armando Julio Urioste Arana.

Early life

Family and education 
The son of Melitón de Urioste Gómez and Petronila Clotilde Velasco del Rivero, who was a first cousin of José Miguel de Velasco, he was born in the city of Sucre to a prominent family. He was educated in France and England where he received an excellent education and established connections for his later career as a diplomat.

He attended the Lycée Fénelon Sainte-Marie in Paris and Ealing Grammar School in London. While in England, he met with fellow Bolivian aristocrat José Gutiérrez Guerra, who attended Stonyhurst College and would become a key ally of Urioste and President of Bolivia.

Political career

Staunch Liberal and clashes with Baptista 
Urioste's political career began in 1884 when he joined Eliodoro Camacho's Liberal Party. That same year, Gregorio Pacheco had been elected President of Bolivia and, although conservative in nature, would become a mentor to Urioste. Regardless of his radical Liberal ideas, Urioste became a close ally and business partner of Pacheco and future president Aniceto Arce. Urioste distinguished himself serving in the Chamber of Deputies. He played a crucial role in expanding and creating electrical grids for several cities in Bolivia, mainly in Sucre.

During his time in the Chamber of Deputies, there were several instances of fights and disagreements, as noted by the recorded transcripts of many sessions, involving Urioste. He was remembered for being inflexible and passionate, being a staunch liberal, which often led to intense verbal jousts with his political opponents.

To his party's dismay, Urioste often acted as a link between the Liberals and Conservatives, oftentimes acting as a mediator between the party leaders. For this, he often clashed with his own partisans as well as with Conservatives. However, when Mariano Baptista became president in 1892, Urioste's relationship with the Conservatives began to sour. Baptista was not a businessman and he had no connection to Urioste, which meant that clashes of ideology would be frequent between the two. Even before Baptista had risen to the presidency, the two had often had thunderous clashes in Congress. Even once Baptista was president, Urioste often argued and disagreed with him.

The Civil War of 1898-1899

Tensions 

Conservative President Severo Fernández wanted to settle the decade-long debate regarding what city was officially the Bolivian capital. Up until 1880, the seat of executive power was wherever the current president resided. Hence, Congress met, between 1825 and 1900, on twenty-nine occasions in Sucre, twenty in La Paz, seven in Oruro, two in Cochabamba and one in Tapacarí. Officially, the capital of Bolivia was Sucre since the presidency of Antonio José de Sucre, remaining as such over the years due to the lack of resources to build a new capital and the influence of its aristocracy. However, by the 1880s, conservative presidents chose to settle in Sucre, making it the de facto capital of the country.

On October 31, 1898, the deputies of Sucre proposed to definitively install the executive capital in Sucre, known as the "Radicatory Law". However, their La Paz counterparts proposed that the Congress should move to Cochabamba (a neutral place), a proposition which was rejected. The liberals seemed to initially accept the plan to make Sucre the official capital. The liberals had don so strategically since if they vetoed they would provoke the inhabitants of the capital, however, if it was approved they could convince the people and the garrison of La Paz (under the orders of Colonel José Manuel Pando) to mount an insurrection. Even though Urioste was a native of Sucre, he supported Pando's movement, causing him to be briefly exiled from his city. On November 6, there was a massive riot in La Paz which demanded called for federalism and for their city to be the capital. On November 14, a Federal Committee was created and chaired by Colonel Pando while its deputies defended their cause in Congress. Three days later, the "Radicatory Law" was approved, with Sucre as the capital and seat of executive power. On November19, it was officially promulgated.

In response, on December 12, with the people of La Paz in their favor, a Federal Board of Liberals and some authorities who switched sides (the Prefect and Commander General Serapio Reyes Ortiz and the Minister of Instruction Macario Pinilla) was formed. Pando's liberals allied themselves with Pablo Zárate Willka, cacique of the Altiplano.

The Outbreak of the Civil War 
After these events, the deputies from La Paz withdrew to their department by order of the Federal Board. The people of La Paz received their representatives with exalted cheers and acclamations. The overthrow of Fernández had now become a main objective of the federalists. In juxtaposition to La Paz, in Sucre, there were public demonstrations in support of the government. Now in La Paz, Urioste denounced several other liberals from Sucre that had abandoned th cause and flipped to the Conservative Party. He had even armed himself and was prepared to die for the Liberal Party, but was persuaded not to fight by his wife.

Fernández decided to march on La Paz with the three divisions stationed in Sucre (Bolívar, Junín and Hussars). In Challapata, he found out that the rebels had acquired more than two thousand weapons, so he called for the recruitment of volunteers in the capital. Two brigades were formed, the first was made up of the 25 de Mayo battalion and the Sucre squadron. These were made up of upper-class youths with their own horses and weapons, and included the Olañeta battalion and the Monteagudo squadron, made up of young men from popular classes. During their march to reinforce the president, the government forces plundered the indigenous populations in the countryside, an action which Urioste denounced and would later create a charity fund for the affected families.

The government's first brigade encountered Pando and numerous warriors in Cosmini, being forced to take refuge in the parish of Ayo Ayo, where they were massacred on January 24, 1899. In Potosí, the population was openly against helping the government forces, meanwhile in Santa Cruz and Tarija there was a clearly neutral stance. Among the indigenous communities of Cochabamba, Oruro, La Paz and Potosí there are uprisings in favor of the Liberals.

The decisive confrontation of the civil war was the battle of the Segundo Crucero, on April 10, 1899, where the president and Pando met. After four hours of combat, Pando's troops were victorious. The defeated withdrew to Oruro and, shortly after, Fernández went into exile. With Pando now in power, Urioste, as a liberal, would become very powerful in Congress, remaining a key figure until the overthrow of his party and ally and friend, José Gutiérrez Guerra, in 1920.

Banker and the easter lynch mob

The Argandoña Bank 
Throughout his life he held various diplomatic positions, his most prominent one being in France. He would also work as a banker and administrator, as he came to be the General Manager of the Argandoña Bank, where he played a crucial role in its creation and flourishment. President Baptista had actually initially opposed the creation of the bank, especially because Francisco Argandoña was a brother-in-law to his fierce rival. Eventually, Baptista, through Arce's efforts, approved and the Bank was created through the Law of October 22, 1892.

The Easter lynch mob 
One of the most famous stories about Urioste took place during the presidency of Aniceto Arce when a mob surrounded the Cathedral of Sucre during Easter and had the intention to lynch the president. Urioste disguised him as a priest at took him into his own home in. All this despite the fact that they had completely opposite political views. They were, however, business partners and allies at the time, showing Urioste's self-interest in saving the President's life.

He would be the recipient of the Order of Isabella the Catholic, an honor he received due to his distinguished services in the field of diplomacy.

Personal life 
Urioste was married to Adela Arana in 1882, a member of an illustrious Bolivian family, with whom he had six children: Amelia Adela; Armando Julio; Luis Roberto; Emma; Gastón Marcel; and Amalia. His son, Armando Julio, would be an important Bolivian industrialist and one of the wealthiest men in the country.

References 

1861 births
1929 deaths
Bolivian diplomats
Bolivian politicians
Bolivian socialites
People from Sucre